Sarconema may refer to:
 Sarconema (nematode), a genus of nematodes in the family Onchocercidae
 Sarconema (alga), a genus of algae in the family Solieriaceae